The EU–Armenia Partnership and Cooperation Agreement (PCA) was a Partnership and Cooperation Agreement between the European Coal and Steel Community (and later the European Union) and Armenia. It was signed in Luxembourg and entered into force on 1 July 1999. The agreement served as the legal framework for EU–Armenia bilateral relations for 21 years, until its termination on 28 February 2021. The PCA was replaced by the Armenia–EU Comprehensive and Enhanced Partnership Agreement (CEPA), a more comprehensive and complex agreement, which entered into force on 1 March 2021.

Background 
Armenia regained its independence following the collapse of the Soviet Union in 1991. Following which, independent Armenia sought to develop stronger relations with European states, and in particular, with the European Coal and Steel Community (ECSC). The Partnership and Cooperation Agreement was designed to establish deeper partnership between the ECSC and Armenia, especially in the areas of trade, commerce, and economic cooperation. The agreement was also aimed at further strengthening political ties between the ECSC and Armenia.

Supposed benefits of PCA 
Provisions in the agreement supported the territorial integrity of Armenia and its progressive integration into the open international system, maintaining peace and security throughout Europe, safeguarding the rule of law and human rights, promoting democratic reforms and free elections, and developing a liberalized free market economy. The agreement also encouraged Armenia to maintain peaceful and constructive relations with its South Caucasus neighbors, develop closer relations with other European institutions, supporting Armenia's membership in the Energy Charter Treaty, and to increase trade and investment between ECSC members and Armenia.

Cancellation of Association Agreement 

Armenia and the EU began negotiating a new and more complex Association Agreement, which had included a Deep and Comprehensive Free Trade Area agreement, to replace the PCA in July 2010. Negotiations were finalized in July 2013 and Armenia (along with Georgia, Moldova and Ukraine) was set to sign the new Association Agreement with the EU during the Eastern Partnership summit in November 2013. However, the Government of Armenia, led by former President Serzh Sargsyan had suddenly broken off negotiations to pursue membership in the Russian-led Eurasian Economic Union. As such, no Association Agreement was signed and the PCA was maintained. 

The European Commission and Armenia later agreed to restart negotiations on a new agreement that would eventually replace the PCA. Former European Commissioner for Neighbourhood and Enlargement Štefan Füle stated that, "the EU stands ready to continue developing ties with Armenia through a new legal framework." While Serzh Sargsyan confirmed that his administration remained committed to deepening ties with the EU and implementing large-scale reforms required for that.

Expiration of PCA and beginning of CEPA 
In December 2015, Armenia and the EU began renegotiating a new agreement on bilateral relations. Following extensive negotiations, the Armenia–EU Comprehensive and Enhanced Partnership Agreement was signed by Armenia and all EU member states on 24 November 2017 and ratified on 25 January 2021. The PCA expired on 28 February 2021 and the new CEPA officially entered into force on 1 March 2021.

See also 

Armenia–European Union relations
Euronest Parliamentary Assembly
European Integration
European Neighbourhood Policy
Foreign relations of Armenia
Foreign relations of the European Union
Potential enlargement of the European Union

References

External links
EU–Armenia Partnership and Cooperation Agreement on EUR-Lex

1999 in Armenia
1999 treaties
European integration
Foreign relations of Armenia
Armenia–European Union relations
Treaties entered into by the European Union
Treaties of Armenia